This is a list of the bird species recorded in Ethiopia. The avifauna of Ethiopia included a total of 880 confirmed species as of August 2021. Of them, 20 are endemic, one has been introduced by humans, and the statuses of 11 are under review. An additional 16 species are hypothetical as defined below. Unless otherwise noted, the list is that of Avibase.

This list's taxonomic treatment (designation and sequence of orders, families and species) and nomenclature (English and scientific names) are those of The Clements Checklist of Birds of the World, 2022 edition.

The following tags highlight several categories of occurrence other than regular migrants and residents.

 (A) Accidental - a species that rarely or accidentally occurs in Ethiopia (also called a vagrant)
 (E) Endemic - a species endemic to Ethiopia
 (I) Introduced - a species introduced to Ethiopia as a consequence, direct or indirect, of human actions
 (S) Status - a species whose status is under review
 (H) Hypothetical - a species possibly present but which has not been documented.

Ostriches
Order: StruthioniformesFamily: Struthionidae

The ostriches are flightless birds native to Africa. They are the largest living species of bird and are distinctive in appearance, with a long neck and legs and the ability to run at high speeds.

Common ostrich, Struthio camelus
North African ostrich, S. c. camelus
Masai ostrich, S. c. massaicus
Somali ostrich, Struthio molybdophanes

Ducks, geese, and waterfowl
Order: AnseriformesFamily: Anatidae

Anatidae includes the ducks and most duck-like waterfowl, such as geese and swans. These birds are adapted to an aquatic existence with webbed feet, flattened bills, and feathers that are excellent at shedding water due to an oily coating.

White-faced whistling-duck, Dendrocygna viduata
Fulvous whistling-duck, Dendrocygna bicolor
White-backed duck, Thalassornis leuconotus
Blue-winged goose, Cyanochen cyanopterus (E)
Knob-billed duck, Sarkidiornis melanotos
Egyptian goose, Alopochen aegyptiaca
Ruddy shelduck, Tadorna ferruginea
Common shelduck, Tadorna tadorna (A)
Spur-winged goose, Plectropterus gambensis
African pygmy-goose, Nettapus auritus
Garganey, Spatula querquedula
Blue-billed teal, Spatula hottentota
Northern shoveler, Spatula clypeata
Gadwall, Mareca strepera
Eurasian wigeon, Mareca penelope
African black duck, Anas sparsa
Yellow-billed duck, Anas undulata
Mallard, Anas platyrhynchos
Cape teal, Anas capensis
Red-billed duck, Anas erythrorhyncha
Northern pintail, Anas acuta
Green-winged teal, Anas crecca (S)
Southern pochard, Netta erythrophthalma
Common pochard, Aythya ferina
Ferruginous duck, Aythya nyroca
Tufted duck, Aythya fuligula
Maccoa duck, Oxyura maccoa

Guineafowl
Order: GalliformesFamily: Numididae

Guineafowl are a group of African, seed-eating, ground-nesting birds that resemble partridges, but with featherless heads and spangled grey plumage.

Helmeted guineafowl, Numida meleagris
Vulturine guineafowl, Acryllium vulturinum

New World quail
Order: GalliformesFamily: Odontophoridae

Despite their family's common name, this species and one other are native to Africa.

Stone partridge, Ptilopachus petrosus

Pheasants, grouse, and allies
Order: GalliformesFamily: Phasianidae

The Phasianidae are a family of terrestrial birds which consists of quail, snowcocks, francolins, spurfowl, tragopans, monals, pheasants, peafowl, and jungle fowl. In general, they are plump (although they vary in size) and have broad, relatively short wings.

Crested francolin, Ortygornis sephaena
Coqui francolin, Campocolinus coqui
Moorland francolin, Scleroptila psilolaemus (E)
Orange River francolin, Scleroptila gutturalis
Common quail, Coturnix coturnix
Harlequin quail, Coturnix delegorguei
Sand partridge, Ammoperdix heyi (H)
Chestnut-naped francolin, Pternistis castaneicollis
Black-fronted francolin, Pternistis atrifrons
Erckel's francolin, Pternistis erckelii
Scaly francolin, Pternistis squamatus
Clapperton's francolin, Pternistis clappertoni
Harwood's francolin, Pternistis harwoodi (E)
Yellow-necked francolin, Pternistis leucoscepus

Flamingos
Order: PhoenicopteriformesFamily: Phoenicopteridae

Flamingos filter-feed on shellfish and algae. Their oddly shaped beaks are specially adapted to separate mud and silt from the food they consume and, uniquely, are used upside-down.

Greater flamingo, Phoenicopterus roseus
Lesser flamingo, Phoeniconaias minor

Grebes
Order: PodicipediformesFamily: Podicipedidae

Grebes are small to medium-large freshwater diving birds. They have lobed toes and are excellent swimmers and divers. However, they have their feet placed far back on the body, making them quite ungainly on land.

Little grebe, Tachybaptus ruficollis
Great crested grebe, Podiceps cristatus
Eared grebe, Podiceps nigricollis

Pigeons and doves
Order: ColumbiformesFamily: Columbidae

Pigeons and doves are stout-bodied birds with short necks and short slender bills with a fleshy cere.

Rock pigeon, Columba livia (I)
Speckled pigeon, Columba guinea
White-collared pigeon, Columba albitorques
Rameron pigeon, Columba arquatrix
Delegorgue's pigeon, Columba delegorguei (A)
Lemon dove, Columba larvata
European turtle-dove, Streptopelia turtur
Dusky turtle-dove, Streptopelia lugens
African collared-dove, Streptopelia roseogrisea
White-winged collared-dove, Streptopelia reichenowi
Mourning collared-dove, Streptopelia decipiens
Red-eyed dove, Streptopelia semitorquata
Ring-necked dove, Streptopelia capicola
Vinaceous dove, Streptopelia vinacea
Laughing dove, Streptopelia senegalensis
Emerald-spotted wood-dove, Turtur chalcospilos
Black-billed wood-dove, Turtur abyssinicus
Blue-spotted wood-dove, Turtur afer
Tambourine dove, Turtur tympanistria
Namaqua dove, Oena capensis
Bruce's green-pigeon, Treron waalia
African green-pigeon, Treron calva

Sandgrouse
Order: PterocliformesFamily: Pteroclidae

Sandgrouse have small, pigeon-like heads and necks, but sturdy compact bodies. They have long pointed wings and sometimes tails and a fast direct flight. Flocks fly to watering holes at dawn and dusk. Their legs are feathered down to the toes.

Chestnut-bellied sandgrouse, Pterocles exustus
Spotted sandgrouse, Pterocles senegallus
Yellow-throated sandgrouse, Pterocles gutturalis
Black-faced sandgrouse, Pterocles decoratus
Lichtenstein's sandgrouse, Pterocles lichtensteinii
Four-banded sandgrouse, Pterocles quadricinctus

Bustards
Order: OtidiformesFamily: Otididae

Bustards are large terrestrial birds mainly associated with dry open country and steppes in the Old World. They are omnivorous and nest on the ground. They walk steadily on strong legs and big toes, pecking for food as they go. They have long broad wings with "fingered" wingtips and striking patterns in flight. Many have interesting mating displays.

Arabian bustard, Ardeotis arabs
Kori bustard, Ardeotis kori
Denham's bustard, Neotis denhami (A) 
Heuglin's bustard, Neotis heuglinii
White-bellied bustard, Eupodotis senegalensis
Little brown bustard, Eupodotis humilis
Buff-crested bustard, Lophotis gindiana
Black-bellied bustard, Lissotis melanogaster
Hartlaub's bustard, Lissotis hartlaubii

Turacos
Order: MusophagiformesFamily: Musophagidae

The turacos, plantain-eaters, and go-away-birds make up the bird family Musophagidae. They are medium-sized arboreal birds. The turacos and plantain-eaters are brightly coloured, usually in blue, green, or purple. The go-away-birds are mostly grey and white.

White-cheeked turaco, Tauraco leucotis
Prince Ruspoli's turaco, Tauraco ruspolii (E)
Bare-faced go-away-bird, Corythaixoides personatus
White-bellied go-away-bird, Corythaixoides leucogaster
Eastern plantain-eater, Crinifer zonurus

Cuckoos
Order: CuculiformesFamily: Cuculidae

The family Cuculidae includes cuckoos, roadrunners, and anis. These birds are of variable size with slender bodies, long tails, and strong legs. The Old World cuckoos are brood parasites.

Senegal coucal, Centropus senegalensis
Blue-headed coucal, Centropus monachus
White-browed coucal, Centropus superciliosus
Black coucal, Centropus grillii
Green malkoha, Ceuthmochares australis
Great spotted cuckoo, Clamator glandarius
Levaillant's cuckoo, Clamator levaillantii
Pied cuckoo, Clamator jacobinus
Dideric cuckoo, Chrysococcyx caprius
Klaas's cuckoo, Chrysococcyx klaas
African emerald cuckoo, Chrysococcyx cupreus
Black cuckoo, Cuculus clamosus
Red-chested cuckoo, Cuculus solitarius
African cuckoo, Cuculus gularis
Common cuckoo, Cuculus canorus

Nightjars and allies
Order: CaprimulgiformesFamily: Caprimulgidae

Nightjars are medium-sized nocturnal birds that usually nest on the ground. They have long wings, short legs, and very short bills. Most have small feet, of little use for walking, and long pointed wings. Their soft plumage is camouflaged to resemble bark or leaves.

Standard-winged nightjar, Caprimulgus longipennis
Eurasian nightjar, Caprimulgus europaeus
Sombre nightjar, Caprimulgus fraenatus
Egyptian nightjar, Caprimulgus aegyptius (A)
Nubian nightjar, Caprimulgus nubicus
Donaldson-Smith's nightjar, Caprimulgus donaldsoni
Fiery-necked nightjar, Caprimulgus pectoralis 
Swamp nightjar, Caprimulgus natalensis (A)
Plain nightjar, Caprimulgus inornatus
Star-spotted nightjar, Caprimulgus stellatus
Nechisar nightjar, Caprimulgus solala (E)
Freckled nightjar, Caprimulgus tristigma
Long-tailed nightjar, Caprimulgus climacurus
Slender-tailed nightjar, Caprimulgus clarus

Swifts
Order: CaprimulgiformesFamily: Apodidae

Swifts are small birds which spend the majority of their lives flying. They have very short legs and never settle voluntarily on the ground, perching instead only on vertical surfaces. Many swifts have long swept-back wings which resemble a crescent or boomerang.

Scarce swift, Schoutedenapus myoptilus
Alpine swift, Apus melba
Mottled swift, Apus aequatorialis
Common swift, Apus apus
Nyanza swift, Apus niansae
Pallid swift, Apus pallidus (A)
African swift, Apus barbatus (A)
Little swift, Apus affinis
Horus swift, Apus horus
White-rumped swift, Apus caffer
African palm-swift, Cypsiurus parvus

Flufftails
Order: GruiformesFamily: Sarothruridae

The flufftails are a small family of ground-dwelling birds found only in Madagascar and sub-Saharan Africa.

Buff-spotted flufftail, Sarothrura elegans (A)
Red-chested flufftail, Sarothrura rufa
White-winged flufftail, Sarothrura ayresi

Rails, gallinules, and coots
Order: GruiformesFamily: Rallidae

Rallidae is a large family of small to medium-sized birds which includes the rails, crakes, coots, and gallinules. Typically they inhabit dense vegetation in damp environments near lakes, swamps, or rivers. In general they are shy and secretive birds, making them difficult to observe. Most species have strong legs and long toes which are well adapted to soft uneven surfaces. They tend to have short, rounded wings and to be weak fliers.

African rail, Rallus caerulescens
Corn crake, Crex crex
African crake, Crex egregia
Rouget's rail, Rougetius rougetii
Spotted crake, Porzana porzana
Lesser moorhen, Paragallinula angulata
Eurasian moorhen, Gallinula chloropus
Eurasian coot, Fulica atra (A) 
Red-knobbed coot, Fulica cristata
Allen's gallinule, Porphyrio alleni
African swamphen, Porphyrio madagascariensis
Black crake, Amaurornis flavirostris
Little crake, Zapornia parva (A) 
Baillon's crake, Zapornia pusilla

Finfoots
Order: GruiformesFamily: Heliornithidae

Heliornithidae is a small family of tropical birds with webbed lobes on their feet similar to those of grebes and coots.

African finfoot, Podica senegalensis

Cranes
Order: GruiformesFamily: Gruidae

Cranes are large, long-legged, and long-necked birds. Unlike the similar-looking but unrelated herons, cranes fly with necks outstretched, not pulled back. Most have elaborate and noisy courting displays or "dances".

Gray crowned-crane, Balearica regulorum (A)
Black crowned-crane, Balearica pavonina
Demoiselle crane, Anthropoides virgo (A)
Wattled crane, Bugeranus carunculatus
Common crane, Grus grus

Thick-knees
Order: CharadriiformesFamily: Burhinidae

The thick-knees are a group of waders found worldwide within the tropical zone, with some species also breeding in temperate Europe and Australia. They are medium to large waders with strong black or yellow-black bills, large yellow eyes, and cryptic plumage. Despite being classed as waders, most species have a preference for arid or semi-arid habitats.

Water thick-knee, Burhinus vermiculatus
Eurasian thick-knee, Burhinus oedicnemus
Indian thick-knee, Burhinus indicus
Senegal thick-knee, Burhinus senegalensis
Spotted thick-knee, Burhinus capensis

Egyptian plover
Order: CharadriiformesFamily: Pluvianidae

The Egyptian plover is found across equatorial Africa and along the Nile River.

Egyptian plover, Pluvianus aegyptius

Stilts and avocets
Order: CharadriiformesFamily: Recurvirostridae

Recurvirostridae is a family of large wading birds which includes the avocets and stilts. The avocets have long legs and long up-curved bills. The stilts have extremely long legs and long, thin, straight bills.

Black-winged stilt, Himantopus himantopus
Pied avocet, Recurvirostra avosetta

Oystercatchers
Order: CharadriiformesFamily: Haematopodidae

The oystercatchers are large and noisy plover-like birds, with strong bills used for smashing or prising open molluscs.

Eurasian oystercatcher, Haematopus ostralegus

Plovers and lapwings
Order: CharadriiformesFamily: Charadriidae

The family Charadriidae includes the plovers, dotterels, and lapwings. They are small to medium-sized birds with compact bodies, short thick necks, and long, usually pointed, wings. They are found in open country worldwide, mostly in habitats near water.

Black-bellied plover, Pluvialis squatarola
European golden-plover, Pluvialis apricaria (A)
Pacific golden plover, Pluvialis fulva
Long-toed lapwing, Vanellus crassirostris
Blacksmith lapwing, Vanellus armatus (H)
Spur-winged lapwing, Vanellus spinosus
Black-headed lapwing, Vanellus tectus
Black-winged lapwing, Vanellus melanopterus
Crowned lapwing, Vanellus coronatus
Wattled lapwing, Vanellus senegallus
Spot-breasted lapwing, Vanellus melanocephalus (E)
Sociable lapwing, Vanellus gregarius 
White-tailed lapwing, Vanellus leucurus (A)
Lesser sand-plover, Charadrius mongolus
Greater sand-plover, Charadrius leschenaultii (A)
Caspian plover, Charadrius asiaticus
Kittlitz's plover, Charadrius pecuarius
Kentish plover, Charadrius alexandrinus
Common ringed plover, Charadrius hiaticula
Little ringed plover, Charadrius dubius
Three-banded plover, Charadrius tricollaris

Painted-snipes
Order: CharadriiformesFamily: Rostratulidae

Painted-snipes are short-legged, long-billed birds similar in shape to the true snipes, but more brightly coloured.

Greater painted-snipe, Rostratula benghalensis

Jacanas
Order: CharadriiformesFamily: Jacanidae

The jacanas are a group of waders found throughout the tropics. They are identifiable by their huge feet and claws which enable them to walk on floating vegetation in the shallow lakes that are their preferred habitat.

Lesser jacana, Microparra capensis
African jacana, Actophilornis africanus

Sandpipers and allies
Order: CharadriiformesFamily: Scolopacidae

Scolopacidae is a large diverse family of small to medium-sized shorebirds including the sandpipers, curlews, godwits, shanks, tattlers, woodcocks, snipes, dowitchers, and phalaropes. The majority of these species eat small invertebrates picked out of the mud or soil. Variation in length of legs and bills enables multiple species to feed in the same habitat, particularly on the coast, without direct competition for food.

Whimbrel, Numenius phaeopus
Eurasian curlew, Numenius arquata
Black-tailed godwit, Limosa limosa
Ruddy turnstone, Arenaria interpres
Ruff, Calidris pugnax
Broad-billed sandpiper, Calidris falcinellus (A)
Curlew sandpiper, Calidris ferruginea
Temminck's stint, Calidris temminckii
Long-toed stint, Calidris subminuta (A)
Sanderling, Calidris alba (A)
Dunlin, Calidris alpina (A)
Little stint, Calidris minuta
Pectoral sandpiper, Calidris melanotos (A)
Asian dowitcher, Limnodromus semipalmatus (H)
Jack snipe, Lymnocryptes minimus
Great snipe, Gallinago media
Common snipe, Gallinago gallinago
African snipe, Gallinago nigripennis
Terek sandpiper, Xenus cinereus
Red-necked phalarope, Phalaropus lobatus
Red phalarope, Phalaropus fulicarius (A)
Common sandpiper, Actitis hypoleucos
Green sandpiper, Tringa ochropus
Spotted redshank, Tringa erythropus
Common greenshank, Tringa nebularia
Lesser yellowlegs, Tringa flavipes (H)
Marsh sandpiper, Tringa stagnatilis
Wood sandpiper, Tringa glareola
Common redshank, Tringa totanus

Buttonquails
Order: CharadriiformesFamily: Turnicidae

The buttonquails are small, drab, running birds which resemble the true quails. The female is the brighter of the sexes and initiates courtship. The male incubates the eggs and tends the young.

Small buttonquail, Turnix sylvaticus
Quail-plover, Ortyxelos meiffrenii (A)

Pratincoles and coursers
Order: CharadriiformesFamily: Glareolidae

Glareolidae is a family of wading birds comprising the pratincoles, which have short legs, long pointed wings, and long forked tails, and the coursers, which have long legs, short wings, and long, pointed bills which curve downwards.

Cream-colored courser, Cursorius cursor (A)
Somali courser, Cursorius somalensis
Temminck's courser, Cursorius temminckii
Double-banded courser, Smutsornis africanus
Three-banded courser, Rhinoptilus cinctus
Bronze-winged courser, Rhinoptilus chalcopterus (A)
Collared pratincole, Glareola pratincola
Black-winged pratincole, Glareola nordmanni
Madagascar pratincole, Glareola ocularis (A)
Rock pratincole, Glareola nuchalis

Skuas and jaegers
Order: CharadriiformesFamily: Stercorariidae

The family Stercorariidae are, in general, medium to large birds, typically with grey or brown plumage, often with white markings on the wings. They nest on the ground in temperate and arctic regions and are long-distance migrants.

Parasitic jaeger, Stercorarius parasiticus (A)

Gulls, terns, and skimmers
Order: CharadriiformesFamily: Laridae

Laridae is a family of medium to large seabirds, the gulls, kittiwakes, terns, and skimmers. Gulls are typically gray or white, often with black markings on the head or wings. They have stout, longish bills and webbed feet. Terns are a group of generally medium to large seabirds typically with gray or white plumage, often with black markings on the head. Most terns hunt fish by diving but some pick insects off the surface of fresh water. Terns are generally long-lived birds, with several species known to live in excess of 30 years. Skimmers are a small family of tropical tern-like birds. They have an elongated lower mandible which they use to feed by flying low over the water surface and skimming the water for small fish.

Slender-billed gull, Chroicocephalus genei (A)
Gray-hooded gull, Chroicocephalus cirrocephalus
Black-headed gull, Chroicocephalus ridibundus
Franklin's gull, Leucophaeus pipixcan (A)
Pallas's gull, Ichthyaetus ichthyaetus
Herring gull, Larus cachinnans (A)
Caspian gull, Larus cachinnans (A)
Lesser black-backed gull, Larus fuscus
Sooty tern, Onychoprion fuscatus (A)
Little tern, Sternula albifrons (A)
Saunders's tern, Sternula saundersi
Gull-billed tern, Gelochelidon nilotica
Caspian tern, Hydroprogne caspia
Black tern, Chlidonias niger (A)
White-winged tern, Chlidonias leucopterus
Whiskered tern, Chlidonias hybrida
Common tern, Sterna hirundo (A)
Arctic tern, Sterna paradisaea (A)
Great crested tern, Thalasseus bergii (A)
Sandwich tern, Thalasseus sandvicensis
African skimmer, Rynchops flavirostris

Storks
Order: CiconiiformesFamily: Ciconiidae

Storks are large, long-legged, long-necked, wading birds with long, stout bills. Storks are mute, but bill-clattering is an important mode of communication at the nest. Their nests can be large and may be reused for many years.

African openbill, Anastomus lamelligerus
Black stork, Ciconia nigra
Abdim's stork, Ciconia abdimii
African woolly-necked stork, Ciconia microscelis
White stork, Ciconia ciconia
Saddle-billed stork, Ephippiorhynchus senegalensis
Marabou stork, Leptoptilos crumenifer
Yellow-billed stork, Mycteria ibis

Anhingas
Order: SuliformesFamily: Anhingidae

Anhingas or darters are often called "snake-birds" because of their long thin neck, which gives a snake-like appearance when they swim with their bodies submerged. The males have black and dark-brown plumage, an erectile crest on the nape and a larger bill than the female. The females have much paler plumage especially on the neck and underparts. The darters have completely webbed feet and their legs are short and set far back on the body. Their plumage is somewhat permeable, like that of cormorants, and they spread their wings to dry after diving.

African darter, Anhinga rufa

Cormorants and shags
Order: SuliformesFamily: Phalacrocoracidae

Phalacrocoracidae is a family of medium to large coastal, fish-eating seabirds that includes cormorants and shags. Plumage colouration varies, with the majority having mainly dark plumage, some species being black-and-white, and a few being colourful.

Long-tailed cormorant, Microcarbo africanus
Great cormorant, Phalacrocorax carbo (S)

Pelicans
Order: PelecaniformesFamily: Pelecanidae

Pelicans are large water birds with a distinctive pouch under their beak. They have webbed feet with four toes.

Great white pelican, Pelecanus onocrotalus
Pink-backed pelican, Pelecanus rufescens

Shoebill
Order: PelecaniformesFamily: Balaenicipididae

The shoebill is a large bird related to the storks. It derives its name from its massive shoe-shaped bill.

Shoebill, Balaeniceps rex

Hamerkop
Order: PelecaniformesFamily: Scopidae

The hamerkop is a medium-sized bird with a long shaggy crest. The shape of its head with a curved bill and crest at the back is reminiscent of a hammer, hence its name. Its plumage is drab-brown all over.

Hamerkop, Scopus umbretta

Herons, egrets, and bitterns
Order: PelecaniformesFamily: Ardeidae

The family Ardeidae contains the bitterns, herons, and egrets. Herons and egrets are medium to large wading birds with long necks and legs. Bitterns tend to be shorter-necked and more wary. Members of Ardeidae fly with their necks retracted, unlike other long-necked birds such as storks, ibises, and spoonbills.

Great bittern, Botaurus stellaris (A)
Little bittern, Ixobrychus minutus
Dwarf bittern, Ixobrychus sturmii
Gray heron, Ardea cinerea
Black-headed heron, Ardea melanocephala
Goliath heron, Ardea goliath
Purple heron, Ardea purpurea
Great egret, Ardea alba
Intermediate egret, Ardea intermedia
Little egret, Egretta garzetta (S)
Western reef-heron, Egretta gularis
Black heron, Egretta ardesiaca
Cattle egret, Bubulcus ibis
Squacco heron, Ardeola ralloides
Striated heron, Butorides striata (S)
Black-crowned night-heron, Nycticorax nycticorax
White-backed night-heron, Gorsachius leuconotus

Ibises and spoonbills
Order: PelecaniformesFamily: Threskiornithidae

Threskiornithidae is a family of large terrestrial and wading birds which includes the ibises and spoonbills. They have long, broad wings with 11 primary and about 20 secondary feathers. They are strong fliers and despite their size and weight, very capable soarers.

Glossy ibis, Plegadis falcinellus
African sacred ibis, Threskiornis aethiopicus
Northern bald ibis, Geronticus eremita 
Hadada ibis, Bostrychia hagedash
Wattled ibis, Bostrychia carunculata (E)
Eurasian spoonbill, Platalea leucorodia
African spoonbill, Platalea alba

Secretarybird
Order: AccipitriformesFamily: Sagittariidae

The secretarybird is a bird of prey but is easily distinguished from other raptors by its long crane-like legs.

Secretarybird, Sagittarius serpentarius

Osprey
Order: AccipitriformesFamily: Pandionidae

The family Pandionidae contains only one species, the osprey. The osprey is a medium-large raptor which is a specialist fish-eater with a worldwide distribution.

Osprey, Pandion haliaetus

Hawks, eagles, and kites
Order: AccipitriformesFamily: Accipitridae

Accipitridae is a family of birds of prey which includes hawks, eagles, kites, harriers, and Old World vultures. These birds have powerful hooked beaks for tearing flesh from their prey, strong legs, powerful talons, and keen eyesight.

Black-winged kite, Elanus caeruleus
Scissor-tailed kite, Chelictinia riocourii
African harrier-hawk, Polyboroides typus
Bearded vulture, Gypaetus barbatus
Egyptian vulture, Neophron percnopterus
European honey-buzzard, Pernis apivorus
African cuckoo-hawk, Aviceda cuculoides
White-headed vulture, Trigonoceps occipitalis
Lappet-faced vulture, Torgos tracheliotos
Hooded vulture, Necrosyrtes monachus
White-backed vulture, Gyps africanus
Rüppell's griffon, Gyps rueppelli
Eurasian griffon, Gyps fulvus
Bateleur, Terathopius ecaudatus
Short-toed snake-eagle, Circaetus gallicus
Beaudouin's snake-eagle, Circaetus beaudouini (A)
Black-chested snake-eagle, Circaetus pectoralis
Brown snake-eagle, Circaetus cinereus
Banded snake-eagle, Circaetus cinerascens
Bat hawk, Macheiramphus alcinus
Crowned eagle, Stephanoaetus coronatus
Martial eagle, Polemaetus bellicosus
Long-crested eagle, Lophaetus occipitalis
Lesser spotted eagle, Clanga pomarina
Greater spotted eagle, Clanga clanga
Wahlberg's eagle, Hieraaetus wahlbergi
Booted eagle, Hieraaetus pennatus
Ayres's hawk-eagle, Hieraaetus ayresii
Tawny eagle, Aquila rapax
Steppe eagle, Aquila nipalensis
Imperial eagle, Aquila heliaca
Golden eagle, Aquila chrysaetos
Verreaux's eagle, Aquila verreauxii
Bonelli's eagle, Aquila fasciata (A)
African hawk-eagle, Aquila spilogaster
Lizard buzzard, Kaupifalco monogrammicus
Dark chanting-goshawk, Melierax metabates
Eastern chanting-goshawk, Melierax poliopterus
Gabar goshawk, Micronisus gabar
Grasshopper buzzard, Butastur rufipennis
Eurasian marsh-harrier, Circus aeruginosus
African marsh-harrier, Circus ranivorus (A)
Pallid harrier, Circus macrourus
Montagu's harrier, Circus pygargus
African goshawk, Accipiter tachiro
Shikra, Accipiter badius
Levant sparrowhawk, Accipiter brevipes (A)
Little sparrowhawk, Accipiter minullus
Ovambo sparrowhawk, Accipiter ovampensis (A)
Eurasian sparrowhawk, Accipiter nisus
Rufous-breasted sparrowhawk, Accipiter rufiventris
Black goshawk, Accipiter melanoleucus
Black kite, Milvus migrans (S)
African fish-eagle, Haliaeetus vocifer
Common buzzard, Buteo buteo (S)
Mountain buzzard, Buteo oreophilus
Long-legged buzzard, Buteo rufinus
Red-necked buzzard, Buteo auguralis
Augur buzzard, Buteo augur

Barn-owls
Order: StrigiformesFamily: Tytonidae

Barn-owls are medium to large owls with large heads and characteristic heart-shaped faces. They have long strong legs with powerful talons.

African grass-owl, Tyto capensis
Barn owl, Tyto alba

Owls
Order: StrigiformesFamily: Strigidae

The typical owls are small to large solitary nocturnal birds of prey. They have large forward-facing eyes and ears, a hawk-like beak, and a conspicuous circle of feathers around each eye called a facial disk.

Eurasian scops-owl, Otus scops
African scops-owl, Otus senegalensis
Northern white-faced owl, Ptilopsis leucotis
Pharaoh eagle-owl, Bubo ascalaphus
Cape eagle-owl, Bubo capensis
Grayish eagle-owl, Bubo cinerascens
Verreaux's eagle-owl, Bubo lacteus
Pel's fishing-owl, Scotopelia peli
Pearl-spotted owlet, Glaucidium perlatum
Little owl, Athene noctua
African wood-owl, Strix woodfordii
Abyssinian owl, Asio abyssinicus
Short-eared owl, Asio flammeus
Marsh owl, Asio capensis

Mousebirds
Order: ColiiformesFamily: Coliidae

The mousebirds are slender greyish or brown birds with soft, hairlike body feathers and very long thin tails. They are arboreal and scurry through the leaves like rodents in search of berries, fruit, and buds. They are acrobatic and can feed upside down. All species have strong claws and reversible outer toes. They also have crests and stubby bills.

Speckled mousebird, Colius striatus
White-headed mousebird, Colius leucocephalus (A)
Blue-naped mousebird, Urocolius macrourus

Trogons
Order: TrogoniformesFamily: Trogonidae

The family Trogonidae includes trogons and quetzals. Found in tropical woodlands worldwide, they feed on insects and fruit, and their broad bills and weak legs reflect their diet and arboreal habits. Although their flight is fast, they are reluctant to fly any distance. Trogons have soft, often colourful, feathers with distinctive male and female plumage.

Narina trogon, Apaloderma narina

Hoopoes
Order: BucerotiformesFamily: Upupidae

Hoopoes have black, white, and orangey-pink colouring with a large erectile crest on their head.

Eurasian hoopoe, Upupa epops (S)

Woodhoopoes and scimitarbills
Order: BucerotiformesFamily: Phoeniculidae

The woodhoopoes and scimitarbills are related to the hoopoes, ground-hornbills, and hornbills. They most resemble the hoopoes with their long curved bills, used to probe for insects, and short rounded wings. However, they differ in that they have metallic plumage, often blue, green, or purple, and lack an erectile crest.

Green woodhoopoe, Phoeniculus purpureus
Violet woodhoopoe, Phoeniculus damarensis (A)
Black-billed woodhoopoe, Phoeniculus somaliensis
Black scimitarbill, Rhinopomastus aterrimus
Abyssinian scimitarbill, Rhinopomastus minor

Ground-hornbills
Order: BucerotiformesFamily: Bucorvidae

The ground-hornbills are terrestrial birds that feed almost entirely on insects, other birds, snakes, and amphibians.

Abyssinian ground-hornbill, Bucorvus abyssinicus

Hornbills
Order: BucerotiformesFamily: Bucerotidae

Hornbills are a group of birds whose bill is shaped like a cow's horn, but without a twist, sometimes with a casque on the upper mandible. Frequently, the bill is brightly coloured.

Crowned hornbill, Lophoceros alboterminatus
Hemprich's hornbill, Lophoceros hemprichii
African gray hornbill, Lophoceros nasutus
Eastern yellow-billed hornbill, Tockus flavirostris
Jackson's hornbill, Tockus jacksoni (A)
Von der Decken's hornbill, Tockus deckeni
Northern red-billed hornbill, Tockus erythrorhynchus
Silvery-cheeked hornbill, Bycanistes brevis

Kingfishers
Order: CoraciiformesFamily: Alcedinidae

Kingfishers are medium-sized birds with large heads, long pointed bills, short legs, and stubby tails.

Common kingfisher, Alcedo atthis (A)
Half-collared kingfisher, Alcedo semitorquata
Malachite kingfisher, Corythornis cristatus
African pygmy kingfisher, Ispidina picta
Gray-headed kingfisher, Halcyon leucocephala
Woodland kingfisher, Halcyon senegalensis
Blue-breasted kingfisher, Halcyon malimbica
Striped kingfisher, Halcyon chelicuti
Giant kingfisher, Megaceryle maximus
Pied kingfisher, Ceryle rudis

Bee-eaters
Order: CoraciiformesFamily: Meropidae

The bee-eaters are a group of near passerine birds in the family Meropidae. Most species are found in Africa but others occur in southern Europe, Madagascar, Australia and New Guinea. They are characterised by richly coloured plumage, slender bodies and usually elongated central tail feathers. All are colorful and have long downturned bills and pointed wings, which give them a swallow-like appearance when seen from afar.

Red-throated bee-eater, Merops bulocki
Little bee-eater, Merops pusillus
Ethiopian bee-eater, Merops lafresnayii
Swallow-tailed bee-eater, Merops hirundineus
Somali bee-eater, Merops revoilii
White-throated bee-eater, Merops albicollis
African green bee-eater, Merops viridissimus
Blue-cheeked bee-eater, Merops persicus
Madagascar bee-eater, Merops superciliosus
European bee-eater, Merops apiaster
Northern carmine bee-eater, Merops nubicus

Rollers
Order: CoraciiformesFamily: Coraciidae

Rollers resemble crows in size and build, but are more closely related to the kingfishers and bee-eaters. They share the colourful appearance of those groups with blues and browns predominating. The two inner front toes are connected, but the outer toe is not.

European roller, Coracias garrulus
Abyssinian roller, Coracias abyssinica
Lilac-breasted roller, Coracias caudata
Rufous-crowned roller, Coracias naevia
Broad-billed roller, Eurystomus glaucurus

African barbets
Order: PiciformesFamily: Lybiidae

The barbets are plump birds with short necks and large heads. They get their name from the bristles which fringe their heavy bills. Most species are brightly coloured.

Red-and-yellow barbet, Trachyphonus erythrocephalus
Yellow-breasted barbet, Trachyphonus margaritatus
D'Arnaud's barbet, Trachyphonus darnaudii
Red-fronted tinkerbird, Pogoniulus pusillus
Yellow-fronted tinkerbird, Pogoniulus chrysoconus
Red-fronted barbet, Tricholaema diademata
Black-throated barbet, Tricholaema melanocephala
Banded barbet, Lybius undatus
Vieillot's barbet, Lybius vieilloti (A)
Black-billed barbet, Lybius guifsobalito
Double-toothed barbet, Lybius bidentatus

Honeyguides
Order: PiciformesFamily: Indicatoridae

Honeyguides are among the few birds that feed on wax. They are named for the greater honeyguide which leads traditional honey-hunters to bees' nests and, after the hunters have harvested the honey, feeds on the remaining contents of the hive.

Green-backed honeyguide, Prodotiscus zambesiae
Wahlberg's honeyguide, Prodotiscus regulus
Lesser honeyguide, Indicator minor
Scaly-throated honeyguide, Indicator variegatus
Greater honeyguide, Indicator indicator

Woodpeckers
Order: PiciformesFamily: Picidae

Woodpeckers are small to medium-sized birds with chisel-like beaks, short legs, stiff tails, and long tongues used for capturing insects. Some species have feet with two toes pointing forward and two backward, while several species have only three toes. Many woodpeckers have the habit of tapping noisily on tree trunks with their beaks.

Eurasian wryneck, Jynx torquilla
Rufous-necked wryneck, Jynx ruficollis
Abyssinian woodpecker, Chloropicus abyssinicus (E)
Cardinal woodpecker, Chloropicus fuscescens
Bearded woodpecker, Chloropicus namaquus
Brown-backed woodpecker, Chloropicus obsoletus
African gray woodpecker, Chloropicus goertae
Mountain gray woodpecker, Chloropicus spodocephalus
Green-backed woodpecker, Campethera cailliautii
Nubian woodpecker, Campethera nubica

Falcons and caracaras
Order: FalconiformesFamily: Falconidae

Falconidae is a family of diurnal birds of prey. They differ from hawks, eagles, and kites in that they kill with their beaks instead of their talons.

Pygmy falcon, Polihierax semitorquatus
Lesser kestrel, Falco naumanni
Eurasian kestrel, Falco tinnunculus
Greater kestrel, Falco rupicoloides
Fox kestrel, Falco alopex
Gray kestrel, Falco ardosiaceus
Red-necked falcon, Falco chicquera
Red-footed falcon, Falco vespertinus (A)
Amur falcon, Falco amurensis (A)
Eleonora's falcon, Falco eleonorae (A)
Sooty falcon, Falco concolor (A)
Eurasian hobby, Falco subbuteo
African hobby, Falco cuvierii
Lanner falcon, Falco biarmicus
Saker falcon, Falco cherrug
Peregrine falcon, Falco peregrinus
Taita falcon, Falco fasciinucha

Old World parrots
Order: PsittaciformesFamily: Psittaculidae

Characteristic features of parrots include a strong curved bill, an upright stance, strong legs, and clawed zygodactyl feet. Many parrots are vividly colored, and some are multi-colored. Old World parrots are found from Africa east across south and southeast Asia and Oceania to Australia and New Zealand.

Rose-ringed parakeet, Psittacula krameri
Red-headed lovebird, Agapornis pullarius
Black-winged lovebird, Agapornis taranta

African and New World parrots
Order: PsittaciformesFamily: Psittacidae

Most of the more than 150 species in this family are found in the New World.

Meyer's parrot, Poicephalus meyeri
Red-bellied parrot, Poicephalus rufiventris
Yellow-fronted parrot, Poicephalus flavifrons (E)

Pittas
Order: PasseriformesFamily: Pittidae

Pittas are medium-sized by passerine standards and are stocky, with fairly long, strong legs, short tails, and stout bills. Many are brightly coloured. They spend the majority of their time on wet forest floors, eating snails, insects, and similar invertebrates.

African pitta, Pitta angolensis (A)

Cuckooshrikes
Order: PasseriformesFamily: Campephagidae

The cuckooshrikes are small to medium-sized passerine birds. They are predominantly greyish with white and black, although some species are brightly coloured.

Gray cuckooshrike, Coracina caesia
White-breasted cuckooshrike, Coracina pectoralis
Black cuckooshrike, Campephaga flava
Red-shouldered cuckooshrike, Campephaga phoenicea

Old World orioles
Order: PasseriformesFamily: Oriolidae

The Old World orioles are colourful birds which are not related to the similar-looking New World orioles.

Eurasian golden oriole, Oriolus oriolus
African golden oriole, Oriolus auratus
Ethiopian black-headed oriole, Oriolus monacha
African black-headed oriole, Oriolus larvatus

Wattle-eyes and batises
Order: PasseriformesFamily: Platysteiridae

The wattle-eyes, or puffback flycatchers, are small stout passerine birds of the African tropics. They get their name from the brightly coloured fleshy eye decorations found in most species in this group.

Brown-throated wattle-eye, Platysteira cyanea
Gray-headed batis, Batis orientalis
Western black-headed batis, Batis erlangeri
Pygmy batis, Batis perkeo

Vangas, helmetshrikes, and allies
Order: PasseriformesFamily: Vangidae

The helmetshrikes are similar in build to the shrikes, but tend to be colourful species with distinctive crests or other head ornaments, such as wattles, from which they get their name.

White helmetshrike, Prionops plumatus

Bushshrikes and allies
Order: PasseriformesFamily: Malaconotidae

Bushshrikes are similar in habits to shrikes, hunting insects and other small prey from a perch on a bush. Although similar in build to the shrikes, these tend to be either colourful species or largely black. Some species are quite secretive.

Brubru, Nilaus afer
Northern puffback, Dryoscopus gambensis
Pringle's puffback, Dryoscopus pringlii
Marsh tchagra, Tchagra minuta
Black-crowned tchagra, Tchagra senegala
Three-streaked tchagra, Tchagra jamesi
Red-naped bushshrike, Laniarius ruficeps
Ethiopian boubou, Laniarius aethiopicus
Black-headed gonolek, Laniarius erythrogaster
Slate-colored boubou, Laniarius funebris
Rosy-patched bushshrike, Rhodophoneus cruentus
Sulphur-breasted bushshrike, Telophorus sulfureopectus
Gray-headed bushshrike, Malaconotus blanchoti

Drongos
Order: PasseriformesFamily: Dicruridae

The drongos are mostly black or dark grey in colour, sometimes with metallic tints. They have long forked tails, and some Asian species have elaborate tail decorations. They have short legs and sit very upright when perched, like a shrike. They flycatch or take prey from the ground.

Fork-tailed drongo, Dicrurus adsimilis
Glossy-backed drongo, Dicrurus divaricatus

Monarch flycatchers
Order: PasseriformesFamily: Monarchidae

The monarch flycatchers are small to medium-sized insectivorous passerines which hunt by flycatching.

African paradise-flycatcher, Terpsiphone viridis

Shrikes
Order: PasseriformesFamily: Laniidae

Shrikes are passerine birds known for their habit of catching other birds and small animals and impaling the uneaten portions of their bodies on thorns. A shrike's beak is hooked, like that of a typical bird of prey.

Red-backed shrike, Lanius collurio
Red-tailed shrike, Lanius phoenicuroides
Isabelline shrike, Lanius isabellinus
Great gray shrike, Lanius excubitor
Lesser gray shrike, Lanius minor
Gray-backed fiscal, Lanius excubitoroides
Taita fiscal, Lanius dorsalis
Somali fiscal, Lanius somalicus
Northern fiscal, Lanius humeralis
Masked shrike, Lanius nubicus
Woodchat shrike, Lanius senator
White-rumped shrike, Eurocephalus ruppelli

Crows, jays, and magpies
Order: PasseriformesFamily: Corvidae

The family Corvidae includes crows, ravens, jays, choughs, magpies, treepies, nutcrackers, and ground jays. Corvids are above average in size among the Passeriformes, and some of the larger species show high levels of intelligence.

Stresemann's bush-crow, Zavattariornis stresemanni (E)
Red-billed chough, Pyrrhocorax pyrrhocorax
Piapiac, Ptilostomus afer
House crow, Corvus splendens (A)
Cape crow, Corvus capensis
Pied crow, Corvus albus
Brown-necked raven, Corvus ruficollis (A)
Somali crow, Corvus edithae
Fan-tailed raven, Corvus rhipidurus
Thick-billed raven, Corvus crassirostris

Hyliotas
Order: PasseriformesFamily: Hyliotidae

The members of this small family, all of genus Hyliota, are birds of the forest canopy. They tend to feed in mixed-species flocks.

Yellow-bellied hyliota, Hyliota flavigaster

Tits, chickadees, and titmice
Order: PasseriformesFamily: Paridae

The Paridae are mainly small stocky woodland species with short stout bills. Some have crests. They are adaptable birds, with a mixed diet including seeds and insects.

White-shouldered black-tit, Melaniparus guineensis
White-winged black-tit, Melaniparus leucomelas
Somali tit, Melaniparus thruppi
White-backed black-tit, Melaniparus leuconotus (E)

Penduline-tits
Order: PasseriformesFamily: Remizidae

The penduline-tits are a group of small passerine birds related to the true tits. They are insectivores.

Sennar penduline-tit, Anthoscopus punctifrons (A)
Mouse-colored penduline-tit, Anthoscopus musculus
Forest penduline-tit, Anthoscopus flavifrons (A)

Larks
Order: PasseriformesFamily: Alaudidae

Larks are small terrestrial birds with often extravagant songs and display flights. Most larks are fairly dull in appearance. Their food is insects and seeds.

Greater hoopoe-lark, Alaemon alaudipes
Rufous-rumped lark, Pinarocorys erythropygia (A)
Bar-tailed lark, Ammomanes cinctura (H)
Desert lark, Ammomanes deserti
Chestnut-backed sparrow-lark, Eremopterix leucotis
Black-crowned sparrow-lark, Eremopterix nigriceps
Chestnut-headed sparrow-lark, Eremopterix signata
Pink-breasted lark, Calendulauda poecilosterna
Fawn-colored lark, Calendulauda africanoides
Liben lark, Heteromirafra archeri
Collared lark, Mirafra collaris
Degodi lark, Mirafra gilletti degodiensis (E)
Red-winged lark, Mirafra hypermetra
Rufous-naped lark, Mirafra africana (A)
Flappet lark, Mirafra rufocinnamomea
Friedmann's lark, Mirafra pulpa (A)
White-tailed lark, Mirafra albicauda (A)
Horsfield’s bushlark, Mirafra javanica
Gillett's lark, Mirafra gilletti
Blanford's lark, Calandrella blanfordi
Rufous-capped lark, Calandrella eremica (A)
Greater short-toed lark, Calandrella brachydactyla
Bimaculated lark, Melanocorypha bimaculata
Somali short-toed lark, Alaudala somalica
Short-tailed lark, Spizocorys fremantlii
Masked lark, Spizocorys personata
Thekla's lark, Galerida theklae
Crested lark, Galerida cristata

African warblers
Order: PasseriformesFamily: Macrosphenidae

African warblers are small to medium-sized insectivores which are found in a wide variety of habitats south of the Sahara.

Northern crombec, Sylvietta brachyura
Short-billed crombec, Sylvietta philippae
Red-faced crombec, Sylvietta whytii
Somali crombec, Sylvietta isabellina
Moustached grass-warbler, Melocichla mentalis

Cisticolas and allies
Order: PasseriformesFamily: Cisticolidae

The Cisticolidae are warblers found mainly in warmer southern regions of the Old World. They are generally very small birds of drab brown or grey appearance found in open country such as grassland or scrub.

Yellow-vented eremomela, Eremomela flavicrissalis
Yellow-bellied eremomela, Eremomela icteropygialis
Green-backed eremomela, Eremomela canescens
Gray wren-warbler, Calamonastes simplex
Green-backed camaroptera, Camaroptera brachyura
Buff-bellied warbler, Phyllolais pulchella
Yellow-breasted apalis, Apalis flavida
Graceful prinia, Prinia gracilis
Tawny-flanked prinia, Prinia subflava
Pale prinia, Prinia somalica
Red-winged prinia, Prinia erythroptera
Red-fronted prinia, Prinia rufifrons
Red-faced cisticola, Cisticola erythrops
Singing cisticola, Cisticola cantans
Boran cisticola, Cisticola bodessa
Rattling cisticola, Cisticola chiniana
Ashy cisticola, Cisticola cinereolus
Red-pate cisticola, Cisticola ruficeps
Ethiopian cisticola, Cisticola haematocephalus
Winding cisticola, Cisticola galactotes
Stout cisticola, Cisticola robustus
Croaking cisticola, Cisticola natalensis
Siffling cisticola, Cisticola brachypterus
Foxy cisticola, Cisticola troglodytes
Tiny cisticola, Cisticola nana
Zitting cisticola, Cisticola juncidis
Desert cisticola, Cisticola aridulus
Black-backed cisticola, Cisticola eximius
Pectoral-patch cisticola, Cisticola brunnescens

Reed warblers and allies
Order: PasseriformesFamily: Acrocephalidae

The members of this family are usually rather large for "warblers". Most are rather plain olivaceous brown above with much yellow to beige below. They are usually found in open woodland, reedbeds, or tall grass. The family occurs mostly in southern to western Eurasia and surroundings, but it also ranges far into the Pacific, with some species in Africa.

Eastern olivaceous warbler, Iduna pallida
African yellow-warbler, Iduna natalensis
Upcher's warbler, Hippolais languida
Olive-tree warbler, Hippolais olivetorum
Icterine warbler, Hippolais icterina
Sedge warbler, Acrocephalus schoenobaenus
Marsh warbler, Acrocephalus palustris
Common reed warbler, Acrocephalus scirpaceus
Basra reed warbler, Acrocephalus griseldis
Lesser swamp warbler, Acrocephalus gracilirostris
Great reed warbler, Acrocephalus arundinaceus

Grassbirds and allies
Order: PasseriformesFamily: Locustellidae

Locustellidae are a family of small insectivorous songbirds found mainly in Eurasia, Africa, and the Australian region. They are smallish birds with tails that are usually long and pointed, and tend to be drab brownish or buffy all over.

Bamboo warbler, Locustella alfredi
River warbler, Locustella fluviatilis
Savi's warbler, Locustella luscinioides
Common grasshopper-warbler, Locustella naevia
Fan-tailed grassbird, Catriscus brevirostris
Cinnamon bracken-warbler, Bradypterus cinnamomeus
Little rush warbler, Bradypterus baboecala
Highland rush warbler, Bradypterus centralis

Swallows
Order: PasseriformesFamily: Hirundinidae

The family Hirundinidae is adapted to aerial feeding. They have a slender streamlined body, long pointed wings, and a short bill with a wide gape. The feet are adapted to perching rather than walking, and the front toes are partially joined at the base.

Plain martin, Riparia paludicola
Bank swallow, Riparia riparia
Banded martin, Neophedina cincta
Eurasian crag-martin, Ptyonoprogne rupestris
Rock martin, Ptyonoprogne fuligula
Barn swallow, Hirundo rustica
Red-chested swallow, Hirundo lucida
Ethiopian swallow, Hirundo aethiopica
Wire-tailed swallow, Hirundo smithii
White-tailed swallow, Hirundo megaensis (E)
Red-rumped swallow, Cecropis daurica (S)
Lesser striped swallow, Cecropis abyssinica
Mosque swallow, Cecropis senegalensis
Red Sea swallow, Petrochelidon perdita (A)
Common house-martin, Delichon urbicum
White-headed sawwing, Psalidoprocne albiceps (A)
Black sawwing, Psalidoprocne pristoptera
Gray-rumped swallow, Pseudhirundo griseopyga

Bulbuls
Order: PasseriformesFamily: Pycnonotidae

Bulbuls are medium-sized songbirds. Some are colourful with yellow, red, or orange vents, cheeks, throats, or supercilia, but most are drab, with uniform olive-brown to black plumage. Some species have distinct crests.

Sombre greenbul, Andropadus importunus (A)
Yellow-throated greenbul, Atimastillas flavicollis
Northern brownbul, Phyllastrephus strepitans
Common bulbul, Pycnonotus barbatus

Leaf warblers
Order: PasseriformesFamily: Phylloscopidae

Leaf warblers are a family of small insectivorous birds found mostly in Eurasia and ranging into Wallacea and Africa. The species are of various sizes, often green-plumaged above and yellow below, or more subdued with greyish-green to greyish-brown colours.

Wood warbler, Phylloscopus sibilatrix (A)
Eastern Bonelli's warbler, Phylloscopus orientalis
Willow warbler, Phylloscopus trochilus
Common chiffchaff, Phylloscopus collybita
Brown woodland-warbler, Phylloscopus umbrovirens

Sylviid warblers, parrotbills, and allies
Order: PasseriformesFamily: Sylviidae

The family Sylviidae is a group of small insectivorous passerine birds. They mainly occur as breeding species, as the common name implies, in Europe, Asia and, to a lesser extent, Africa. Most are of generally undistinguished appearance, but many have distinctive songs.

Eurasian blackcap, Sylvia atricapilla
Garden warbler, Sylvia borin
Abyssinian catbird, Sylvia galinieri (E)
African hill babbler, Sylvia abyssinica
Barred warbler, Curruca nisoria
Banded parisoma, Curruca boehmi
Lesser whitethroat, Curruca curruca
Brown parisoma, Curruca lugens
Western Orphean warbler, Curruca hortensis
Eastern Orphean warbler, Curruca crassirostris
Asian desert warbler, Curruca nana
Menetries's warbler, Curruca mystacea
Rüppell's warbler, Curruca ruppeli (H)
Eastern subalpine warbler, Curruca cantillans (A)
Greater whitethroat, Curruca communis

White-eyes, yuhinas, and allies 
Order: PasseriformesFamily: Zosteropidae

The white-eyes are small and mostly undistinguished, their plumage above being generally some dull color like greenish-olive, but some species have a white or bright yellow throat, breast or lower parts, and several have buff flanks. As their name suggests, many species have a white ring around each eye.

Pale white-eye, Zosterops flavilateralis
Abyssinian white-eye, Zosterops abyssinicus
Heuglin's white-eye, Zosterops poliogastrus
Northern yellow white-eye, Zosterops senegalensis

Laughingthrushes and allies
Order: PasseriformesFamily: Leiothrichidae

The laughingthrushes are somewhat diverse in size and colouration, but are characterised by soft fluffy plumage.

Rufous chatterer, Argya rubiginosa
Scaly chatterer, Argya aylmeri
Fulvous chatterer, Argya fulva
Brown babbler, Turdoides plebejus
White-rumped babbler, Turdoides leucopygius
Scaly babbler, Turdoides squamulatus
Cretzschmar's babbler, Turdoides leucocephalus
Dusky babbler, Turdoides tenebrosus

Treecreepers
Order: PasseriformesFamily: Certhiidae

Treecreepers are small woodland birds, brown above and white below. They have thin pointed down-curved bills, which they use to extricate insects from bark. They have stiff tail feathers, like woodpeckers, which they use to support themselves on vertical trees.

African spotted creeper, Salpornis salvadori

Oxpeckers
Order: PasseriformesFamily: Buphagidae

As both the English and scientific names of these birds imply, they feed on ectoparasites, primarily ticks, found on large mammals.

Red-billed oxpecker, Buphagus erythrorynchus
Yellow-billed oxpecker, Buphagus africanus

Starlings
Order: PasseriformesFamily: Sturnidae

Starlings are small to medium-sized passerine birds. Their flight is strong and direct and they are very gregarious. Their preferred habitat is fairly open country. They eat insects and fruit. Plumage is typically dark with a metallic sheen.

European starling, Sturnus vulgaris (A)
Wattled starling, Creatophora cinerea
Rosy starling, Pastor roseus (A)
Violet-backed starling, Cinnyricinclus leucogaster
Slender-billed starling, Onychognathus tenuirostris
Red-winged starling, Onychognathus morio
White-billed starling, Onychognathus albirostris
Bristle-crowned starling, Onychognathus salvadorii
Somali starling, Onychognathus blythii
Magpie starling, Speculipastor bicolor
Sharpe's starling, Poeoptera sharpii
Stuhlmann's starling, Poeoptera stuhlmanni
Shelley's starling, Lamprotornis shelleyi
Rüppell's starling, Lamprotornis purpuropterus
Splendid starling, Lamprotornis splendidus
Golden-breasted starling, Lamprotornis regius
Superb starling, Lamprotornis superbus
Chestnut-bellied starling, Lamprotornis pulcher
White-crowned starling, Lamprotornis albicapillus
Fischer's starling, Lamprotornis fischeri
Lesser blue-eared starling, Lamprotornis chloropterus
Greater blue-eared starling, Lamprotornis chalybaeus

Thrushes and allies
Order: PasseriformesFamily: Turdidae

The thrushes are a group of passerine birds that occur mainly in the Old World. They are plump, soft plumaged, small to medium-sized insectivores or sometimes omnivores, often feeding on the ground. Many have attractive songs.

Abyssinian ground-thrush, Geokichla piaggiae
Groundscraper thrush, Turdus litsitsirupa
Song thrush, Turdus philomelos
Abyssinian thrush, Turdus abyssinicus
African bare-eyed thrush, Turdus tephronotus
African thrush, Turdus pelios

Old World flycatchers
Order: PasseriformesFamily: Muscicapidae

Old World flycatchers are a large group of small passerine birds native to the Old World. They are mainly small arboreal insectivores. The appearance of these birds is highly varied, but they mostly have weak songs and harsh calls.

African dusky flycatcher, Muscicapa adusta
Spotted flycatcher, Muscicapa striata
Gambaga flycatcher, Muscicapa gambagae
Cassin's flycatcher, Muscicapa cassini (H)
African gray flycatcher, Bradornis microrhynchus
Pale flycatcher, Agricola pallidus
Gray tit-flycatcher, Fraseria plumbea
Silverbird, Empidornis semipartitus
Northern black-flycatcher, Melaenornis edolioides
Abyssinian slaty-flycatcher, Melaenornis chocolatinus
Black scrub-robin, Cercotrichas podobe
Rufous-tailed scrub-robin, Cercotrichas galactotes
Red-backed scrub-robin, Cercotrichas leucophrys
Rüppell's robin-chat, Cossypha semirufa
White-browed robin-chat, Cossypha heuglini
Red-capped robin-chat, Cossypha natalensis
Snowy-crowned robin-chat, Cossypha niveicapilla
White-crowned robin-chat, Cossypha albicapilla
Spotted morning-thrush, Cichladusa guttata
White-throated robin, Irania gutturalis
Thrush nightingale, Luscinia luscinia
Common nightingale, Luscinia megarhynchos
Bluethroat, Luscinia svecica
Semicollared flycatcher, Ficedula semitorquata
European pied flycatcher, Ficedula hypoleuca (H)
Common redstart, Phoenicurus phoenicurus
Black redstart, Phoenicurus ochruros
Little rock-thrush, Monticola rufocinereus
Rufous-tailed rock-thrush, Monticola saxatilis
Blue rock-thrush, Monticola solitarius
Whinchat, Saxicola rubetra
Siberian stonechat, Saxicola maurus (S)
African stonechat, Saxicola torquatus
Moorland chat, Pinarochroa sordida
Mocking cliff-chat, Thamnolaea cinnamomeiventris
White-winged cliff-chat, Thamnolaea semirufa (E)
Rüppell's chat, Myrmecocichla melaena
Northern wheatear, Oenanthe oenanthe
Rusty-breasted wheatear, Oenanthe frenata
Isabelline wheatear, Oenanthe isabellina
Heuglin's wheatear, Oenanthe heuglini
Desert wheatear, Oenanthe deserti
Cyprus wheatear, Oenanthe cypriaca (A)
Eastern black-eared wheatear, Oenanthe melanoleuca
Pied wheatear, Oenanthe pleschanka
White-fronted black-chat, Oenanthe albifrons
Somali wheatear, Oenanthe phillipsi
Blackstart, Oenanthe melanura
Familiar chat, Oenanthe familiaris
Sombre rock chat, Oenanthe dubia
Brown-tailed chat, Oenanthe scotocerca
White-crowned wheatear, Oenanthe leucopyga
Abyssinian wheatear, Oenanthe lugubris
Mourning wheatear, Oenanthe lugens
Persian wheatear, Oenanthe chrysopygia (A)

Sunbirds and spiderhunters
Order: PasseriformesFamily: Nectariniidae

The sunbirds and spiderhunters are very small passerine birds which feed largely on nectar, although they will also take insects, especially when feeding young. Flight is fast and direct on their short wings. Most species can take nectar by hovering like a hummingbird, but usually perch to feed.

Eastern violet-backed sunbird, Anthreptes orientalis
Collared sunbird, Hedydipna collaris
Pygmy sunbird, Hedydipna platura (A)
Nile Valley sunbird, Hedydipna metallica
Olive sunbird, Cyanomitra olivacea
Scarlet-chested sunbird, Chalcomitra senegalensis
Hunter's sunbird, Chalcomitra hunteri
Tacazze sunbird, Nectarinia tacazze
Bronze sunbird, Nectarinia kilimensis
Malachite sunbird, Nectarinia famosa
Olive-bellied sunbird, Cinnyris chloropygius
Beautiful sunbird, Cinnyris pulchellus
Mariqua sunbird, Cinnyris mariquensis
Red-chested sunbird, Cinnyris erythrocerca (H)
Black-bellied sunbird, Cinnyris nectarinioides
Purple-banded sunbird, Cinnyris bifasciatus (A)
Tsavo sunbird, Cinnyris tsavoensis
Shining sunbird, Cinnyris habessinicus
Variable sunbird, Cinnyris venustus
Copper sunbird, Cinnyris cupreus

Weavers and allies
Order: PasseriformesFamily: Ploceidae

The weavers are small passerine birds related to the finches. They are seed-eating birds with rounded conical bills. The males of many species are brightly coloured, usually in red or yellow and black, though some species show variation in colour only in the breeding season.

White-billed buffalo-weaver, Bubalornis albirostris
Red-billed buffalo-weaver, Bubalornis niger
White-headed buffalo-weaver, Dinemellia dinemelli
Speckle-fronted weaver, Sporopipes frontalis
White-browed sparrow-weaver, Plocepasser mahali
Chestnut-crowned sparrow-weaver, Plocepasser superciliosus
Donaldson-Smith's sparrow-weaver, Plocepasser donaldsoni
Gray-headed social-weaver, Pseudonigrita arnaudi
Black-capped social weaver, Pseudonigrita cabanisi
Red-headed weaver, Anaplectes rubriceps
Baglafecht weaver, Ploceus baglafecht
Little weaver, Ploceus luteolus
Black-necked weaver, Ploceus nigricollis
Spectacled weaver, Ploceus ocularis
Golden palm weaver, Ploceus bojeri (A)
Northern masked-weaver, Ploceus taeniopterus
Lesser masked-weaver, Ploceus intermedius
Vitelline masked-weaver, Ploceus vitellinus
Rüppell's weaver, Ploceus galbula
Speke's weaver, Ploceus spekei
Village weaver, Ploceus cucullatus
Salvadori's weaver, Ploceus dichrocephalus
Black-headed weaver, Ploceus melanocephalus
Chestnut weaver, Ploceus rubiginosus
Cinnamon weaver, Ploceus badius (H)
Compact weaver, Pachyphantes superciliosus
Cardinal quelea, Quelea cardinalis
Red-headed quelea, Quelea erythrops
Red-billed quelea, Quelea quelea
Northern red bishop, Euplectes franciscanus
Black-winged bishop, Euplectes hordeaceus
Black bishop, Euplectes gierowii
Yellow-crowned bishop, Euplectes afer
Yellow bishop, Euplectes capensis
White-winged widowbird, Euplectes albonotatus
Yellow-mantled widowbird, Euplectes macroura
Red-cowled widowbird, Euplectes laticauda
Fan-tailed widowbird, Euplectes axillaris
Grosbeak weaver, Amblyospiza albifrons

Waxbills and allies
Order: PasseriformesFamily: Estrildidae

The estrildid finches are small passerine birds of the Old World tropics and Australasia. They are gregarious and often colonial seed eaters with short thick but pointed bills. They are all similar in structure and habits, but have wide variation in plumage colours and patterns.

Gray-headed silverbill, Spermestes griseicapilla
Bronze mannikin, Spermestes cucullatus
Magpie mannikin, Spermestes fringilloides
Black-and-white mannikin, Spermestes bicolor
African silverbill, Euodice cantans
Yellow-bellied waxbill, Coccopygia quartinia
Green-backed twinspot, Mandingoa nitidula
Abyssinian crimsonwing, Cryptospiza salvadorii
Black-cheeked waxbill, Brunhilda charmosyna
Fawn-breasted waxbill, Estrilda paludicola
Common waxbill, Estrilda astrild
Black-rumped waxbill, Estrilda troglodytes
Crimson-rumped waxbill, Estrilda rhodopyga
Quailfinch, Ortygospiza atricollis
Cut-throat, Amadina fasciata
Zebra waxbill, Amandava subflava
Purple grenadier, Granatina ianthinogaster
Red-cheeked cordonbleu, Uraeginthus bengalus
Blue-capped cordonbleu, Uraeginthus cyanocephalus
Green-winged pytilia, Pytilia melba
Orange-winged pytilia, Pytilia afra
Red-billed pytilia, Pytilia lineata (E)
Red-billed firefinch, Lagonosticta senegala
African firefinch, Lagonosticta rubricata
Jameson's firefinch, Lagonosticta rhodopareia
Bar-breasted firefinch, Lagonosticta rufopicta
Black-faced firefinch, Lagonosticta larvata

Indigobirds
Order: PasseriformesFamily: Viduidae

The indigobirds are finch-like species which usually have black or indigo predominating in their plumage. All are brood parasites, which lay their eggs in the nests of estrildid finches.

Pin-tailed whydah, Vidua macroura
Sahel paradise-whydah, Vidua orientalis
Exclamatory paradise-whydah, Vidua interjecta
Eastern paradise-whydah, Vidua paradisaea
Steel-blue whydah, Vidua hypocherina
Straw-tailed whydah, Vidua fischeri
Village indigobird, Vidua chalybeata
Wilson's indigobird, Vidua wilsoni
Jambandu indigobird, Vidua raricola
Baka indigobird, Vidua larvaticola
Purple indigobird, Vidua purpurascens (A)
Parasitic weaver, Anomalospiza imberbis

Old World sparrows
Order: PasseriformesFamily: Passeridae

Sparrows are small passerine birds. In general, sparrows tend to be small, plump, brown or grey birds with short tails and short powerful beaks. Sparrows are seed eaters, but they also consume small insects.

House sparrow, Passer domesticus (A)
Somali sparrow, Passer castanopterus
Shelley's rufous sparrow, Passer shelleyi
Northern gray-headed sparrow, Passer griseus
Swainson's sparrow, Passer swainsonii
Parrot-billed sparrow, Passer gongonensis
Sudan golden sparrow, Passer luteus
Chestnut sparrow, Passer eminibey
Yellow-spotted bush sparrow, Gymnoris pyrgita
Sahel bush sparrow, Gymnoris dentata
Pale rockfinch, Carpospiza brachydactyla

Wagtails and pipits
Order: PasseriformesFamily: Motacillidae

Motacillidae is a family of small passerine birds with medium to long tails. They include the wagtails, longclaws, and pipits. They are slender ground-feeding insectivores of open country.

Mountain wagtail, Motacilla clara
Gray wagtail, Motacilla cinerea
Western yellow wagtail, Motacilla flava
Citrine wagtail, Motacilla citreola (A)
African pied wagtail, Motacilla aguimp
White wagtail, Motacilla alba
African pipit, Anthus cinnamomeus
Long-billed pipit, Anthus similis
Tawny pipit, Anthus campestris
Plain-backed pipit, Anthus leucophrys
Tree pipit, Anthus trivialis
Red-throated pipit, Anthus cervinus
Bush pipit, Anthus caffer (A)
Golden pipit, Tmetothylacus tenellus
Abyssinian longclaw, Macronyx flavicollis (E)

Finches, euphonias, and allies
Order: PasseriformesFamily: Fringillidae

Finches are seed-eating passerine birds that are small to moderately large and have a strong beak, usually conical and in some species very large. All have twelve tail feathers and nine primaries. These birds have a bouncing flight with alternating bouts of flapping and gliding on closed wings, and most sing well.

White-rumped seedeater, Crithagra leucopygia
Yellow-fronted canary, Crithagra mozambica
African citril, Crithagra citrinelloides
Southern citril, Crithagra hyposticuta (A)
Reichenow's seedeater, Crithagra reichenowi
Yellow-rumped serin, Crithagra xanthopygia
White-bellied canary, Crithagra dorsostriata
Yellow-throated serin, Crithagra flavigula (E)
Salvadori's serin, Crithagra xantholaema (E)
Northern grosbeak-canary, Crithagra donaldsoni
Streaky seedeater, Crithagra striolata
Reichard's seedeater, Crithagra reichardi
Brown-rumped seedeater, Crithagra tristriata
Ankober serin, Crithagra ankoberensis (E)
Yellow-crowned canary, Serinus flavivertex
Ethiopian siskin, Serinus nigriceps (E)

Old World buntings
Order: PasseriformesFamily: Emberizidae

The emberizids are a large family of passerine birds. They are seed-eating birds with distinctively shaped bills. Many emberizid species have distinctive head patterns.

Brown-rumped bunting, Emberiza affinis
Cinereous bunting, Emberiza cineracea
Ortolan bunting, Emberiza hortulana
Cretzschmar's bunting, Emberiza caesia (A)
Golden-breasted bunting, Emberiza flaviventris
Somali bunting, Emberiza poliopleura
Cinnamon-breasted bunting, Emberiza tahapisi
Gosling's bunting, Emberiza goslingi (A)
Striolated bunting, Emberiza striolata

See also
List of birds
Lists of birds by region

References

External links
Birds of Ethiopia - World Institute for Conservation and Environment
Birding Ethiopia List of bird pictures including songs of endemic Ethiopian birds

Ethiopia
Birds
Ethiopia
Ethiopia